The Prince George's County Sheriff's Office (PGSO), officially the Office of the Sheriff, Prince George's County, provides law enforcement services in Prince George's County, Maryland in the United States. Its headquarters are located in Upper Marlboro, near the Depot Pond. The sheriff is the chief law enforcement officer of Prince George's County and is elected every four years. There are no term limits for the sheriff.

Created in 1696, the traditional duties of the sheriff are keeper of the public peace and the enforcement arm of the county court, analogous to the U.S. Marshals Service. The PGSO has a relatively long history compared to other police departments and sheriff's offices in Maryland. The PGSO was involved with events that occurred during the burning of Washington and affected the writing of "The Star-Spangled Banner". Prior to 1931, the PGSO was the sole law enforcement organization of the county.

Today, the duties of the sheriff include law enforcement services of the two county courthouses and surrounding property, service of court-ordered warrants, writs, protective orders, and other injunctions, and limited patrol responsibility with the County Police. The Domestic Violence Unit has expanded its role in the county to include responding to calls for service that are domestic-related. The creation of the School Resource Deputy division has placed a deputy sheriff at all of the local high schools, replacing the County Police. All other law enforcement services of the county are provided by multiple agencies but mostly left to the separate Prince George's County Police Department (PGPD), though some responsibilities are shared by both agencies. The PGSO, like most other county-level law enforcement agencies in the United States, is a progressive agency with an array of services, from the Specialized Services Team (dealing with high-risk arrest warrants and barricaded situations) to community services aiding the county's residents in safety education.

The PGSO was accredited for the first time by the Commission on Accreditation for Law Enforcement Agencies, Inc. (CALEA) in 2018.

Authority
The sheriff is the chief law enforcement official of Prince George's County, per Maryland common law. All deputy sheriffs are certified, sworn law enforcement officials with full power of arrest. All sworn members of the sheriff's office are agents of the U.S. state of Maryland and thus have authority throughout the entire state, although direct jurisdiction is limited to the Seventh Judicial Circuit of Maryland, which includes Calvert County, Charles County, Prince George's County, and St. Mary's County.

History

1690s–1720s: Founding and British rule
The Sheriff's Office was founded April 22, 1696, when Maryland was a colony of England. The governor of Maryland, Sir Francis Nicholson, appointed Thomas Hillary as the first sheriff. The St. Paul's Church in Charlestown held the headquarters for the Sheriff's Office until the 1720s when it was relocated to the town of Upper Marlboro. At the time of the 18th century, there was no set salary for the sheriff, but he was often paid in tobacco. From 1696 to 1776, the sheriff was appointed by the colonial governor to a one-year term. In 1776, the Maryland constitution changed this so that the sheriff was elected by the voters to three-year terms.

1810s: War of 1812

During the War of 1812, which lasted from 1812 to 1815, an incident occurred at the time of the burning of Washington, D.C., when the sheriff's office became involved in an occurrence that led to the writing of the U.S. national anthem. As the British Army marched from Washington they passed through Prince George's County. Because the residents had cooperated with the British, the commander ensured that minimal damage was inflicted upon the local residents and their property. After the Battle of Bladensburg, the British Army returned to the area of Upper Marlboro. However, this time some of the British soldiers looted local farms. A sheriff's posse subsequently arrested the offending soldiers and placed them in the county jail. Upon learning about the arrest of his soldiers, the British commander ordered the arrest of the sheriff and the posse in turn. One of the posse members was Dr. William Beam. Beam was ultimately arrested and held for ransom on a British warship. Beam's brother-in-law, Francis Scott Key, went to Baltimore Harbor in search of him. He witnessed the British fleet under attack which was the inspiration of "The Star-Spangled Banner".

During the war, an incident occurred involving the Prince George's County jail, when local resident Dr. William Beanes, (1775–1824) captured several marauding British Army deserters from the passing army of General General Robert Ross (1766–1814) and Vice Admiral, Sir George Cockburn, (1772–1853), and held them in the County Jail, after he had treated several wounded "Redcoat" soldiers in their march on to Washington and the disastrous Battle of Bladensburg on the Eastern Branch stream of the Anacostia River in August 1814. Later he was arrested along with several others including Robert Bowie, former 11th Governor of Maryland (1803–06, 1811–12) by retreating British cavalry on orders from Ross who had stayed in his home as headquarters. Later Francis Scott Key (1779–1843), a Georgetown and Frederick lawyer with Col. John S. Skinner, U.S. Prisoner-of-War and Parole Agent went to Baltimore secured a small sailing ship, the Minden, and sailed down the Patapsco River and the Chesapeake Bay to find the British Royal Navy fleet after leaving the Patuxent River, beating up the Bay from their base on Tangier Island, Virginia heading for their attack on the hated "nest of pirates" - Baltimore. After being received and negotiating with General Ross, Admiral Cockburn and their superior, Admiral Sir Alexander Cochrane, (1758–1832), and showing him some letters written by captured British wounded soldiers testifying to  the fair treatment Beanes had given them and tended to them, they agreed to free him but that would be held up until they could celebrate after the Burning of Baltimore following their attack on Fort McHenry and landing troops to the east at North Point. Well, the famous story has been told, how the general was killed prior to the skirmishing at the Battle of North Point on September 12, how the advancing British under successor, Colonel Arthur Brooke led the British regiments to face the 20,000 drafted and volunteer citizens and militia under the command of Major General Samuel Smith, (1752–1839), of the Maryland Militia on the eastern heights of "Loudenschlager's Hill" (later known as "Hampstead Hill" in modern Patterson Park, between Highlandtown and Canton neighborhoods) whose dug-in fortifications and dragged cannon were so numerous that the "Redcoats" halted in their tracks and decided to await the shelling of the fort which guarded the entrances to the Harbor to pass into the inner port and the waterfront of Fells Point. Following the failure of the fort to fall to two days of "the rockets' red glare and the bombs bursting in air" and their flanking troop-loaded barge attack around the west end but driven back by alert artillery seamen at Forts Covington and Babcock in a driving night rainstorm, the British fleet turned about and set sail. Key and his companions Beanes and Skinner who were startled, amazed and emotionally overcome  to see a huge 30 by 42 foot banner being raised in the light of the early morning with the distant booming of the morning's gun salute, knew that the fort and the city had held. When they landed at "The Basin" (modern "Inner Harbor") and Key finished up his draft of a new poem "The Defence of Fort McHenry" at the Indian Queen Hotel at West Baltimore and Hanover Streets, (later to be set to music in a few days) and sung lustily through the city, performed on the stage at the famed Holliday Street Theatre, and then soon throughout the state and soon the nation as "The Star Spangled Banner".

In 1851, the sheriff's term was changed from a three-year term to a two-year term.

1922–1930: Sheriff and police split
In 1922, the sheriff's term length was extended from two years to four years.

From 1929 to 1930, due to an increase in population and crime, Prince George's County created a separate police department. Prior to this time, laws allowed detectives to be used on loan from the Baltimore City Police Department. The newly-created police department allowed the Sheriff's Office to focus its manpower on enforcing orders of the court.

1994–2000: Funding cuts and vacancies 
From December 12, 1994, to January 2000, the PGSO did not hire any new deputies or civilian employees, leaving the agency with 92 vacant positions that needed to be filled. Over that period, 66 deputies left the agency, some retiring routinely, others leaving due to increased workloads caused by vacant positions. In some cases, deputies worked sixteen hours in one day, eight in courtrooms, and eight serving warrants. In December 1994, the agency had 248 deputies, whereas on January 20, 2000, it only had 192 deputies, with 20 leaving from November 1998 to January 2000. In July 1996, the county government decreased the amount of funding the PGSO was receiving. Unlike the PGPD at the time, the PGSO was not nationally accredited and did not receive accreditation until 2018. Computers were also in short supply, and the few that were in use were outdated and obsolete.

In 1996, the Southern Management Company, a firm responsible for managing residential apartments complexes, filed a lawsuit against the sheriff and the county government, with the plaintiffs alleging that they lost revenue due to the sheriff's office inability to evict tenants who were not paying their rent costs.

In 1998, Alonzo D. Black II was elected sheriff of Prince George's County. He was the first African American to be elected sheriff of Prince George's County.

In January 2000, it was revealed that the PGSO held seized money inside of a safe and did not report it to higher authorities. In response to the news, the county council responded that they did not object to the PGSO's actions.

In February 2000, the county government attempted to gain 57 million dollars from the state government at a courthouse in Charles County, to cover the costs of having sheriff's deputies providing security at a district court since 1971. The state countered that the county was responsible for any of the costs incurred.

In March 2000, the county executive announced 1.4 billion dollar budget for the county's government in the 2001 fiscal year, which included funding increases for the sheriff's office.

2000–2002: Intra-departmental politics
At the end of October 2000, the PGSO had 129 deputies.

At the end of October 2001, the PGSO had 125 deputies, down from the previous year.

On August 23, 2002, dozens of members from the Deputy Sheriff's Association issued a vote of no confidence against the incumbent sheriff, Alonzo D. Black, during a meeting at the county's courthouse. The vote, they claimed, was issued due to allegations that the sheriff made against members of the agency, in which he said they were deliberately malingering in order to reflect badly on him. The sheriff rejected the allegations as unfounded and voiced his displeasure over the vote, calling them politically motivated due to their proximity to the primary elections, which was only weeks away at the time.

At the end of October 2002, the PGSO had 124 deputies, down from the previous year.

2002: Deputies killed in the line of duty

On the evening of Thursday, August 29, 2002, two PGSO sheriff's deputies, Corporal James Victor "Jim" Arnaud, aged 53, and Deputy Elizabeth "Liz" Licera Magruder, aged 30, were killed in the line of duty while trying to serve an Emergency Petition Service (EPS), a court-ordered psychological evaluation, on James Ramiah Logan, a 23-year-old part-time computer technician, drug dealer, and High Point High School graduate.

Background
At approximately 9:30 p.m., on the night of August 29, 2002, Corporal Arnaud and Deputy Magruder arrived at the residence of James Ramiah Logan, a 23-year-old man and convicted felon who lived at his parents' single-story rambler house at 9332 Lynmont Drive in Adelphi, Maryland, near the Buck Lodge Middle School. According to departmental protocol, they were to arrive at the house with a third deputy, however, none were available at the time. They were to serve a petition to have an emergency psychiatric evaluation performed on Logan. Earlier in the day, Logan's wife, Valencia Flood, fearing for her safety and the safety of her children, filed the petition with the judicial system to have her husband receive treatment, saying that Logan was "paranoid" and that he "needs to be hospitalized immediately" as "his condition was worsening". The petition entailed the deputies taking Logan to a hospital, where he would have his psychiatric health examined by medical personnel. A few days earlier, on August 26, Logan had been examined by a psychiatrist, who diagnosed him with paranoid schizophrenia and recommended that he be admitted to a medical institution to receive treatment for his mental health. Logan adamantly believed that he was in sound mental health and refused to consent to any such treatment, and as such, he was not admitted to such an institution and was released.

After the deputies arrived at the man's house, Logan's father, James Logan Sr., a television repairman, led them inside the residence, where Logan was in the basement conducting a Bible study with Anthony Antwan Kromah, a 19-year-old man from Hyattsville, Maryland. Earlier in the month, Logan was released from a St. Mary's County detention center after being arrested and posting a $25,000 bond. He had been arrested by a Maryland state trooper who had found cocaine, marijuana, and a .38 caliber handgun in Logan's automobile after stopping him as he was driving with Kromah and another man in St. Mary's County. Logan was charged with possession of an illegal controlled substance with the intent to distribute. Logan had also been using cocaine and smoking marijuana earlier in the day.

After the deputies went into the basement, he was asked by Arnaud to come with him, who said to him, "You've got to come and go with me now." However, Logan adamantly refused, saying "I told you, I'm not going with you anywhere." Logan then ran up the staircase and went into his former bedroom, now used as a guest bedroom, and closed the door. Arnaud and Magruder followed him to the room and stood outside the door. Arnaud tried to convince Logan to come out of the room, as Logan's parents and Magruder, who had joined the department in February 2001, stood by, watching. After Logan's parents left the scene and went to the house's master bedroom, Logan became belligerent and uncooperative. Partially hidden behind a closet door, Logan retrieved a semi-automatic 9mm-chambered handgun and fired at Arnaud, where a bullet struck him in the throat and severed his carotid artery. Logan then shot Arnaud fatally in the chest.

Seeing Arnaud felled by gunfire, Magruder, who was wearing body armor, stepped back and drew her sidearm. However, before she could return fire, Logan then shot six bullets at her, one of which struck her in the head, mortally wounding her. Logan then went over to Arnaud and, while standing over his body, shot him four more times, injuring his liver and inducing severe internal bleeding. Arnaud would die from severe gunshot-induced blood loss at the scene, but the mortally wounded Magruder was able to call for assistance over her radio at 9:34 p.m. Logan's father, who was in the house's master bedroom, had heard the gunshots, and thinking that the deputies had shot him, went over to see what had happened. Instead, he saw Logan leaving the house with a firearm in hand, and saw that the two deputies had been shot. Logan's father then called 9-1-1 via telephone at 9:39 p.m. to report the shooting to authorities. Emergency medical technicians arrived and removed Arnaud and Magruder from the house via stretchers. Magruder was airlifted on a medical helicopter to the Prince George's Hospital Center, with CPR being applied on her while en route. However, she would be pronounced dead at the hospital before midnight.

Manhunt
After shooting Magruder and killing Arnaud, Logan then fled the scene with Kromah in a silver-painted Dodge Charger with Maryland license plates, with Kromah driving the vehicle. After leaving the house, Kromah took the weapon from Logan and attempted to wipe off any residual evidence, such as fingerprints, from it. The two then disposed of the murder weapon by burying it at a nearby forested cemetery and abandoned the getaway vehicle. Kromah was captured and charged as an accomplice to the murder; he pleaded guilty on April 24, 2003 to being an accessory after the fact to a murder. In the meantime, Logan stayed briefly at the residence of Twyla James, a woman who lived in Largo, Maryland. James would later be arrested and charged as an accessory to murder as she had transported Logan, who she had known was a murder suspect and fugitive sought by legal authorities, to her residence and allowed him to stay there. Logan was apprehended two days after the murder, on August 31, 2002, at a shed near the Quebec Arms Apartments in Hyattsville, Maryland, on the 8200 block of 14th Avenue. He was spotted there by undercover policemen, who had received information that it had been an area that Logan was known to frequent in the past. Logan was found hiding in the shed by policemen, who then used a police canine and a taser to subdue and apprehend him. The firearm believed to be used in the murders was recovered earlier as well.

After his capture, Logan was taken to the Prince George's Hospital Center, where he received stitches and sutures, being treated for canine bites on his ankle and arms. After receiving medical treatment for his injuries, Logan was taken to a police station, where he was interrogated for approximately three-and-a-half hours by Vincent "Vince" Canales, a PGPD detective, where he admitted to the murders. When asked by the detective why he had murdered the deputies, rather than fleeing without killing them, Logan said "I wanted to annihilate them, I couldn't leave them alive". The interrogation was recorded by a camera and stored onto a VHS cassette tape and DVD, the contents of which would later be used in his murder trial as evidence to assist in convicting him. In November 2002, Logan's attorney, Fred Warren Bennett, claimed that Logan could not be held criminally responsible for the murders, due to mental deficiencies and poor psychiatric health. In response, the judiciary mandated that Logan undergo a psychiatric evaluation.

Trial
At his trial in late October 2003, Logan's attorney, Fred Warren Bennett, argued that although Logan did kill the deputies, he was not criminally responsible for the killings due to mental illness, and thus, should be acquitted by reason of insanity. However, the state's prosecution argued that any mental deficiencies Logan had were brought about by his usage of illegal narcotics, such as cocaine and marijuana, and as such, he would be legally responsible for the murders.

Ultimately, the jury did not agree with the arguments put forth by Logan's defense attorney and Logan was convicted of second-degree murder on November 10, 2003, after jurors deliberated for ten hours over the span of three days over his fate. A few weeks later, on December 12, 2003, Logan was sentenced by the trial's judge, E. Allen Shepherd, to one hundred years of imprisonment, without the possibility of parole.

Before he was sentenced, Logan apologized to the relatives and comrades of his victims, and asked Shepherd to show mercy in his sentencing him. Shepherd rebuked Logan's pleas for mercy, citing the heinous nature of the crime, which he remarked as being the most callous one that he had ever encountered as a member of the judiciary. Shepherd said to Logan, "I've never experienced a case of a murder more cold-blooded than those that occurred in this case" and "You decided you were going to annihilate those two people".

Retrial
Despite his conviction, Logan's attorneys tried to appeal to the courts, with the one-hundred year prison sentence being unanimously upheld by a three-judge judicial panel on June 15, 2004. However, in their decision, the panel granted him the possibility of paroled release after fifty years. However, more than a year later, on September 7, 2005, the conviction was overturned by the Maryland Court of Appeals and Logan was awarded a second trial. The judiciary determined that the investigators had acted with impropriety in the process of obtaining of Logan's confession to the murders by violating Logan's Miranda rights, and by deliberately misleading him in order to obtain a confession. The court also determined that the judiciary's selection process of jurors for the trial had not been rigorous enough and had thus been conducted improperly.

Logan's retrial began in June 2007, with the prosecution unable to use Logan's confession to present its case for conviction, for the judiciary had ruled that it had been obtained with impropriety. In the retrial, the prosecution used the same argument it had used in the original trial back in 2003, arguing that Logan's insanity defense was illegitimate due to his usage of illegal controlled substances. The state's prosecution argued that Logan himself was solely responsible for any deficiencies in his mental health, saying that they were brought about through his consumption of illegal narcotics, such as cocaine and marijuana, the two illegal controlled substances which he had used on the day of the murders. Ultimately, the first attempt at a retrial ended in June 2007 with a mistrial after jurors could not come to a verdict after ten hours of deliberations. On July 1, 2007, Logan's attorney died after being involved in an automobile collision on Route 10 in Glen Burnie, further complicating matters. However, a few months later, Logan was subsequently convicted again after pleading guilty and sentenced to thirty years of imprisonment on October 24, 2007, with credit for the five years he had already served, much to the disappointment of the victims' surviving family members, who felt he deserved a lifelong imprisonment for his crime.

Legacy
The murders occurred eleven days before the Maryland Democratic Party's primary election to determine its candidate for the Prince George's County sheriff. As there were no candidates running for sheriff in any other parties, the winner of the primary election would automatically run unopposed in the general election itself. The incumbent sheriff, Alonzo D. Black II, lost nomination and reelection to the union president, Michael A. Jackson, who went on to be elected sheriff. Jackson vowed to implement new measures to prevent a similar incident from occurring in the future.

Arnaud was posthumously promoted to sergeant, and Magruder was posthumously promoted to deputy first class. At the time of his death Arnaud was married to his wife, Theresa, and had several children. At the time of her death, Magruder was married to her husband Derwinn and had a three-year-old son named Devinn.
 In September 2002, Arnaud and Magruder were posthumously honored before the U.S. House of Representatives by U.S. Representative Steny H. Hoyer of Maryland's 5th congressional district.

The killings helped to spur the passage of a new Maryland state law pertaining to the treatment of the mentally ill, which went into effect on October 1, 2003. The law's creation and passage were spurred in part by testimony from Logan's parents, James Logan Sr. and Karen Logan. The law allows a judge to order a mandatory psychiatric evaluation of a person, if the person presented a threat to themselves or to others.

In March 2017, Logan was considered for release on parole by the state, but was ultimately denied amid opposition from relatives of the victims.

2008: Deputy wounded in Laurel
On February 16, 2008, at approximately 3:30 a.m., PGSO SWAT team member, Cpl. Cal Bowers, was shot and critically wounded while serving a warrant as part of a task force with Deputy U.S. Marshals. The suspect, Aaron M. Lowry, was wanted for the shooting of Washington, D.C. police officer Antonio Duncan. Lowry was subsequently shot and killed by police. The injured deputy was flown to Baltimore Shock Trauma Center where he had surgery and was upgraded to serious but stable condition, and survived.

2008: Berwyn Heights mayor's residence raid

On July 29, 2008, the PGPD and PGSO raided the home of Cheye Calvo, the mayor of the Town of Berwyn Heights. The raid team did not coordinate their action with the local police department as required by mutual agreement, nor did they did not obtain a warrant or knock on the door to announce their presence. They raided the house with explosive devices and with firearms drawn. During the course of the raid, they shot and killed the Calvo family's two pet Labrador retriever dogs.

No charges were filed against the family. A PGSO internal investigation stated that the PGSO's actions were justified. In 2010, Sheriff Michael A. Jackson, defended the actions taken during the raid, saying: "Quite frankly we'd do it again tonight."

2012: Courthouse misconduct
In June 2012, Deputy Lamar McIntyre was convicted of "malfeasance in office," upon having sex with a woman who was in custody at the county courthouse. In 2014, he pleaded guilty and was sentenced to three years in custody, with all but one year suspended. He was mandated to be required to submit to eighteen months of supervised probation.

2012–present
In 2014, Melvin High was elected to another term as sheriff.

In late 2015, the PGSO received Ford Taurus Police Interceptors for use in its vehicular fleet.

In 2018, the PGSO became nationally accredited for the first time by the Commission on Accreditation for Law Enforcement Agencies, Inc. (CALEA) after more than 18 years of attempting to obtain accreditation. The PGSO's CALEA Team was officially notified of the award on March 24, 2018 in Dallas, Texas. The PGSO's sheriff was awarded the certificate of accreditation by the CALEA Executive Director, Mr. W. Craig Hartley Jr.

Organization

The sheriff is elected by the citizens of Prince George's County. The rank structure of the remaining members of the Sheriff's Office is, like many U.S. law enforcement agencies, modeled after the U.S. military. The ranks of student deputy through corporal are non-competitive. Sergeant through captain are competitive. The ranks of major, lieutenant colonel (Assistant Sheriff), and colonel (Chief Assistant Sheriff) are appointed by, and serve at the discretion of the sheriff.

The PGSO is divided into three bureaus:

Headquarters
The Prince George's County Sheriff's Office's headquarters was located at the county seat of Upper Marlboro until 2000, when Sheriff Alonzo D. "Al" Black II, moved it to the nearby town of Largo where it remained until August 2008. His successor, Sheriff Michael A. Jackson returned the office headquarters to Upper Marlboro, near the Depot Pond, where it remains today. He was succeeded by Sheriff Melvin C. High in 2010, who was subsequently re-elected in 2014, and passed away in office in 2022.

Bureau of Court Services
The PGSO's Bureau of Court Services is based out of the court complex located within the municipality of Upper Marlboro and is responsible for the safety and security of the circuit court in Upper Marlboro, transportation of inmates, and to provide assistant security and law enforcement services to the District Court in Upper Marlboro and Hyattsville, as well as domestic violence liaison services. The Bureau of Court Services is subdivided into four sections: Circuit Court, District Court, Transportation, and Building Security.
Specifically, the bureau is responsible for the safety and security of the 7th Judicial Circuit for the State of Maryland and the District Court for Prince George's County located within the court complexes and adjacent property in Upper Marlboro and Hyattsville. Yearly, between the Circuit Court, District Court, Transportation, and Building Security Sections, the bureau transports an average of 31,000 prisoners, effects 700 warrant and warrantless arrests, and interviews over 8,000 victims of domestic violence.

Bureau of Field Operations
The PGSO's Bureau of Field Operations was based out of the Largo Substation and is charged with: Civil/Landlord & Tenant, Domestic Violence Intervention Unit (DVIU or DV Unit), Warrant/Fugitive Squad, and Child Support Enforcement.
The Civil section is responsible for service of criminal and civil summonses, and other court-ordered writs. The Landlord and Tenant (L&T) Section is responsible for notification of delinquent rent and/or mortgage payments/foreclosures, and court-ordered evictions. The section receives approximately 10,000 writs for non-payment each month.

The Domestic Violence Intervention Unit's primary responsibility is response to domestic-related 9-1-1 calls, court-ordered psychiatric commitments, and ex parte protective order service. The Prince George's DV Unit was the first in the State of Maryland and the first to operate on a 24-hour basis, and is considered a nationally recognized model. The unit receives on average over 1,200 orders per month, the highest in the state.

Bureau of Administration

The PGSO's Bureau of Administration is based out of the main headquarters located in Upper Marlboro and contains the School Resource, Public Information Office (PIO), Recruiting, Training, and Internal Affairs.
The Public Information Office (PIO) also operates an Explorers Post, Prince George's County Sheriff's Office Explorer Post #1696 for Prince George's County youths between the ages of 15 (or 14, provisionally) and 20. The sheriff and his command staff operate out of the Sheriff's Office complex located in Upper Marlboro. Most of the civilian support personnel also work out of this facility providing administrative duties such as NCIC monitoring, teletype (TTY), uniform and supply, criminal warrant research and organization, as well as other administrative duties as directed.

Special Operations Division

The PGSO's Special Operations Division (SOD) is responsible for specialized and specific services. The division is commanded by an assistant bureau chief and has different teams specifically responsible for: SST (SWAT)-response, executive and witness protection, riot control, crisis negotiations, intelligence gathering, motorcycle escort, and ceremonial duties.

Specialized units
Specialized Services Team (SST)
VIP/Witness Protection Team (VIPER)
Civil Disturbance Unit (CDU)
K-9
Motorcycle Unit
D.A.R.E.
Hostage Negotiation Team
Homeland Security and Intelligence

Union representation
Sworn PGSO personnel below the rank of captain, are represented by the Fraternal Order of Police (FOP), Lodge 112. The FOP is a labor union that provides, among other things, collective bargaining and legal assistance for its members. The current president of the FOP is Gary Yancy.

Sheriffs

Line of duty deaths
There have been two PGSO deputy sheriffs killed in the line of duty, both in August 2002.

Rank structure

Fleet
The Prince George's County Sheriff's Office currently operates a fleet consisting primarily of sixth-generation Ford Taurus Police Interceptors, ninth generation Chevrolet Impalas and Ford Crown Victoria Police Interceptors. It also operates the Ford Police Interceptor Utility, both the post-2013 and post-2016 variants. The PGSO's transportation unit uses specialized Chevrolet and Dodge vans, whereas the motorcycle unit uses Harley-Davidson Police Edition motorcycles. The PGSO also has a Freightliner FS-65 bus.

In the past, the PGSO used eighth generation Chevrolet Impalas, first generation Ford Crown Victorias, fifth generation Pontiac Grand Prix sedans, Jeep Cherokees, as well as a few 1999 to 2001 Chevrolet Luminas.

The current paint scheme of the PGSO's marked cruisers is a white base paint with brown and gold striping with the word "SHERIFF" emblazoned on the side doors. In the past, the PGSO's horizontal vehicular stripe decals were green and gold, with a simple PGSO patch door decal being used before that, along with black "SHERIFF" lettering written in a sans-serif typeface. The light bars used on the PGSO's cars are a slim Whelen Generation II LED version, with red and blue lighting. The Domestic Violence Intervention Unit has all marked vehicles with Panasonic Toughbook computers assigned to the cars.

Current vehicles

Past vehicles

See also

 List of law enforcement agencies in Maryland
 Prince George's County, Maryland
 Prince George's County Police Department

Notes

References

Further reading

External links

 
 Deputy Sheriffs Association/Fraternal Order of Police, Maryland Lodge 112
 Prince George's County Sheriff's Office at the Police Car Website
 Prince George's County Sheriff's Office at the National Police Car Archives
 
 
 
 
 
 
 
 
 
 

1696 establishments in Maryland
Sheriff's Office
Sheriffs' offices of Maryland